This page provides a full timeline of web search engines, starting from the Archie search engine in 1990. It is complementary to the history of web search engines page that provides more qualitative detail on the history.

Timeline

See also
 Timeline of Google Search

References

Web search engines
Web search engines